The 2017–18 Bundesliga was the 55th season of the Bundesliga, Germany's premier football competition. It began on 18 August 2017 and concluded on 12 May 2018. The fixtures were announced on 29 June 2017.

Following an offline test phase in the previous season, the video assistant referee system was used for the first time in the Bundesliga on a trial basis following approval from IFAB.

Bayern Munich were the defending champions and won their 27th Bundesliga title on 7 April with five games to spare, winning a sixth consecutive title for the first time in their history. 1. FC Köln and Hamburger SV were relegated at the end of the season, with the latter therefore losing their status as the only ever-presents in Bundesliga history.

Summary
One of the managerial changes before the start of the season was at Borussia Dortmund, who had finished third the previous season. After sacking Thomas Tuchel, they hired the Dutchman Peter Bosz in June 2017, after he had led Ajax to the 2017 UEFA Europa League Final. Dortmund were also the German club involved in the biggest transfer of the summer, selling young French forward Ousmane Dembélé to Barcelona for an initial €105 million. Meanwhile, reigning champions Bayern Munich prepared for the season by breaking the league's transfer record in their purchase of French midfielder Corentin Tolisso from Lyon for €41.5 million.

On 28 September 2017, Bayern sacked manager Carlo Ancelotti amidst reports of player unrest, despite the club sitting in third place. He was replaced by Jupp Heynckes in his fourth spell at the club. On 28 October, a 2–0 win over RB Leipzig put Bayern on top of the table for the first time in the season. In December, Dortmund sacked Bosz with the team in seventh, and replaced him with the Austrian Peter Stöger who himself had recently been dismissed by winless bottom team 1. FC Köln.

In the January 2018 transfer window, Dortmund lost the season's second-top scorer, Gabonese forward Pierre-Emerick Aubameyang, who moved to Arsenal for a €63 million fee. They replaced him by bringing in Chelsea's Michy Batshuayi on loan. From December to February, Bayern went on a 10-match winning streak that ended with a goalless draw with Hertha BSC at the Allianz Arena, and managed 13 unbeaten until a 1–2 loss at Leipzig on 18 March.

Dortmund remained unbeaten for 12 games between December and 31 March, when they lost 0–6 away to Bayern. Schalke 04, who finished only 10th the previous season, were in the top 3 for most of the season. They were unbeaten for 11 games between September and January, putting together six consecutive victories in February and March before a 2–3 loss at bottom team Hamburg.

Bayern won their 27th Bundesliga and 28th German title (6th consecutive) on 7 April 2018, with five games left to play after defeating fellow Bavarian club FC Augsburg 4–1. Three weeks later, Köln were the first team relegated after a 2–3 loss to SC Freiburg. On 5 May, Schalke secured second place and a return to the Champions League for the first time in four years, with a 2–1 win at Augsburg. On the last matchday, 1899 Hoffenheim beat Dortmund 3–1 to finish ahead of the latter on goal difference at an all-time high third place and securing a spot in the Champions League group stage for the first time in their history. Following VfL Wolfsburg's 4–1 win over Köln, Hamburg were relegated from the Bundesliga for the first time in their history.

Bayern Munich's Robert Lewandowski was the league's top scorer for the third time, a record for a foreign player. He scored 29 goals, 14 more than second-placed Nils Petersen of Freiburg.

Teams

A total of 18 teams participated in this edition of the Bundesliga.

Team changes

Stadiums and locations

Personnel and kits

Managerial changes

League table

Results

Relegation play-offs
All times are UTC+2.

First leg

Second leg

VfL Wolfsburg won 4–1 on aggregate and therefore both clubs remain in their respective leagues.

Statistics

Top scorers

Hat-tricks

Clean sheets

Awards

Goal of the year (2017) 
Sebastien Haller won that award for his goal for Eintracht Frankfurt.

Number of teams by state

References

External links

Bundesliga seasons
1
Germany